Groppo is a district (frazione) of the Riolunato municipality (comune), located in Modena province, Emilia-Romagna region, Italy.

Geography 
Groppo is both an hamlet and a territory. The territory boundaries are: the Scoltenna creek (south-east); the Palagano territory, beyond the Giardini and Vandelli routes (north-west); the Pievepelago territory (south-west) and Roncombrellaro (north-east). As a territory, it includes Cabonargi and many other small inhabited areas and it is about 3 km2 wide.

History 
During the 15th century, Groppo was already a municipality, endowed with its own statutes. It became part of the municipality of Riolunato quite recently; in 1845 it was still part of the Pievepelago community, one of the five communities into which Frignano was divided (the others were Pavullo, Fanano, Sestola and Fiumalbo). In 1786–1787, a great landslide affected the town, reaching as far as the Scoltenna creek.

Notable natives of Groppo include Father Claudio Fini, famous in the second half of the sixteenth century as a theologian and preacher, a witness to the holiness of St. Aloysius Gonzaga; Saverio Cabonargi, a follower of Mazzini, who inspired the participation of the Frignanese mountain in the 1831 Modena revolution and Luigi Cabonargi (died 1852), a doctor in Rome and a friend of Stendhal.

During the final phase of the Second World War, the territory of Groppo was just north of the Gothic Line; during that time an American reconnaissance aircraft crashed in the heights near the village: the body of the pilot, Paul M. Thorngren, from Boone, Iowa, was temporarily buried near the parish church and now rests in the Florence American Cemetery.

Operation Herring took place in the same era, in which the paratrooper Enea Cucchi participated and died on 22 April 1945. Enea was born there; he was awarded the silver medal for military valour and a street and a commemorative plaque are dedicated to him.

References 

Municipalities of the Province of Modena